Gonçalo Mendes da Maia (1079? in Maia? – 1170 in Alentejo), also known as O Lidador (The Toiler), so named for his fearlessness in the struggle against the Saracens, was a Portuguese knight of the time of Afonso Henriques, about whom tradition relates important achievements in the events preceding the independence of Portugal. He had a military post as a fronteiro in the border town of Beja, where he died in 1170, while fighting against a Muslim army. According to some documents, he was at the time ninety years old. Traditionally, Gonçalo Mendes da Maia is considered a hero of both the city of Maia, the homeland of the Mendes da Maia family, and Beja.

Bibliology
 Grande Enciclopédia Portuguesa e Brasileira - 50 vols. , Vários, Editorial Enciclopédia, Lisboa. vol. 16-pg. 887.
 D. António Caetano de Sousa, História Genealógica da Casa Real Portuguesa,  Atlântida-Livraria Editora, Lda, 2ª Edição, Coimbra, 1946, Tomo XII-P-pg. 147
Mattoso, José (1981). A nobreza medieval portuguesa: a família e o poder. Lisboa: Editorial Estampa. OCLC 8242615
Sottomayor-Pizarro, José Augusto (1997). Linhagens Medievais Portuguesas: Genealogias e Estratégias (1279-1325). I. Porto: Universidade do Porto
 Gayo, Manuel José da Costa Felgueiras, Nobiliário das Famílias de Portugal, 2ª Edição, Braga, 1989.

Notes

References
Ângelo Ribeiro, História de Portugal - A Formação do Território - Da Lusitânia ao alargamento do País (2004) 

11th-century births
1170 deaths
People of the Reconquista
Portuguese knights
People from Maia, Portugal
People from Beja, Portugal
11th-century Portuguese people
12th-century Portuguese people
Portuguese military personnel killed in action